Sandra Louise Birdsell, CM (née Bartlette) (born 22 April 1942) is a Canadian novelist and short story writer of Métis and Mennonite heritage from Morris, Manitoba.

Life and career
Born in Hamiota, Manitoba, Birdsell was the fifth of eleven children. She lived most of her early life in Morris, Manitoba, where the family moved after her father joined the army in 1943. Her father was a French-speaking Cree Métis born in Canada and her mother was a Low-German speaking Mennonite who was born in Russia.  When Birdsell was six and a half, her sister died from leukemia, which left a four-year gap between her and her next older sister. Her loneliness led her to ponder by herself to the nearby parks and rivers allowing her imagination to go wild.

Her hometown of Morris experienced a major flood in 1950. Her first three stories in Night Travellers are based on that flood. Birdsell left home at the age of fifteen, where she studied at the University of Winnipeg and the University of Manitoba, where she studied under Robert Kroetsch. In 1996, she moved to Regina, Saskatchewan, and currently resides in Ottawa, Ontario.

At the age of thirty-five, she enrolled in Creative Writing at the University of Winnipeg. Five years later, Turnstone Press published her first book, Night Travellers.

In January 2007, Birdsell began a four-month term as the Carol Shields writer in residence at the University of Winnipeg. In 2010, Birdsell was appointed a Member of the Order of Canada and in 2012 she was invested with Saskatchewan Order of Merit (SOM).

She is a mother to three children and a grandmother to four children.

Publications

Short stories

Night Travellers 
Birdsell's first book, a collections of interconnected short stories, Night Travellers(1982), is set in the imaginary Manitoba town of Agassiz, and concerns the large Lafreniere family: the teenaged sisters Betty, Lureen and Truda, their Mennonite mother Mika and their Métis father Maurice and the girls’ maternal grandparents, Oma and Opa Thiessen. Agassiz is based on the flood-prone town of Morris, on the banks of the Red River. where Birdsell spent her childhood. The source for the name Agassiz is Lake Agassiz, an enormous glacial lake that around 13,000 years ago covered much of what are now Manitoba, northwestern Ontario, northern Minnesota, eastern North Dakota, and Saskatchewan. Lake Agassiz is a controlling metaphor for the stories ... representing memory and ancestry". While the devastating flood that happened in Morris in 1950 "is a related image that reverberates throughout the text".

1984 Night Travellers received the Gerald Lampert Award from League of Canadian Poets. Usually this its awarded for a first book of poetry.

Ladies of the House
Birdsell's second collection, from 1984, is a sequel collection to Night Travellers that the focuses on the Laftenierre family women from Agassiz and their women friends, though most of the stories ae set in Winnipeg. In 1987 it was republished with Night Travellers, in one volume called Agassiz Stories. An American edition, titled Agassiz: A Novel in Stories, appeared in 1991 (Minneapolis: Milkweed).

Children's literature 
The Town That Floated Away (1997) was influenced by Birdsell's experience as a child of the 1950 flood in Morris, and narrates the adventures of young Virginia Potts after she is left behind when her town floats away. Birdsell also wrote A Prairie Boy’s Winter, a one act play for children, which was co-written and produced by Prairie Theatre Exchange, in 1986.

Novels

The Missing Child 

Birdsell's first novel, published in 1989, is "an evocative magic realist portrait of the fictional town of Agassiz",
which won the W.H. Smith/Books in Canada First Novel Award.

Chrome Suite 
Birdsell's second novel was published in 1992, and covers four decades of script-writer Amy Barber's life: from an extraordinarily hot summer in a small Manitoba town in 1950; "to the 1960s and the 1970s, when Amy marries, goes to live in the city, and begins to have reason to fear for her young son"; to the present, with Amy traveling from Toronto to Winnipeg with her young Polish, film-maker lover.

The Russländer 
Published in 2001, this is Birdsell's third novel, and it explores Birdsell's own family history. The word Russländer means "Russians" in German and her mother and maternal grandparents were Mennonite emigrants from Russia. It was published as Katya in the US.

It is the story of Katherine (Katya) Vogt, and her Mennonite family's life in Russia from the end of 1910, until she, her husband, two sisters, and grandparents emigrated to Canada in 1923. Katya was born in 1902.

The story begins with the family living on the prosperous Mennonite estate of Abram Suddermann in the Ukraine, where Katya's father is the overseer. They are under the protection of the Tsar whose wife is German. This is part of the Chortitza Colony, land granted to German-speaking Mennonites for colonization. Chortitza was founded in 1789 by Plautdietsch-speaking  Mennonite settlers from West Prussia, and consisted of many villages. It was the first of many Mennonite settlements in the Russian Empire.

Life then becomes much harder when World War I begins and there is suspicion as to the loyalty of the Mennonites because they speak German. Life then eases when where the area is occupied by Austrian and German soldiers. However, Russia falls into chaos when they leave in 1917, with the February and October Revolutions. The Russian workers on the estate take the bloody revenge on the Mennonites. Katya's parents and her siblings, but for two sisters are brutally murdered. After years of poverty and near-starvation. Katya, her husband, sisters, and grandparents eventually emigrate to Canada in 1923, to settle in Manitoba: "Between 1923 and 1930, nearly 25,000 Mennonites fled violence that erupted in the Soviet Union".

Recognition

Prizes and honours 
1984 Gerald Lampert Award from League of Canadian Poets, 1984, for Night Travellers
1990 Books in Canada First Novel Award (for The Missing Child)
1992 Shortlist, Governor General's Award for English-language fiction (for The Chrome Suite)
1993 Marian Engel Award
1997 Shortlist, Governor General's Award for Fiction (for The Two-Headed Calf)
1997 Shortlist, Silver Birch Award; Saskatchewan Children's Literature Award, for The Town That Floated Away
2001 Shortlist, Giller Prize (for The Russländer)
2001 Saskatchewan Book of the Year, Best Saskatchewan Fiction and City of Regina (for The Russländer)
2007 Longlist, International Dublin Literary Award (for Children of the Day)
2007 Saskatchewan Best Fiction Award (for Children of the Day)
2010 Shortlist, Governor General's Award for English fiction (Waiting for Joe)
Juno Award nomination for radio play, The Town That Floated Away"

 Awards 
Marion Engel Award for meritorious achievements of a woman writer in mid-career.
The Joseph S. Stauffer Prize, The Canadian Council 1992, for meritorious achievements in the arts.
Juno Award nomination for radio play, The Town that Floated Away.
National Magazine Award and nomination for short fiction.
45 Below Award, by The Canadian Book Information Center. Chosen as one of ten most promising below the age of 45.
Awarded writing grant from The Manitoba Arts Council, The Canadian Council and the Saskatchewan Arts Board.
Nominee for 2010 Saskatchewan Book Award Shortlists: Fiction Award. Waiting for Joe (Random House Canada).

Bibliography

NovelsThe Missing Child (1989). Lester & Orpen DennysThe Chrome Suite (1992). McClelland & StewartThe Russländer (2001). McClelland & Stewart; as Katya in the US in 2004Children of the Day (2005). Random HouseWaiting for Joe (2010). Random House

ChildrensThe Town that Floated Away (illustrations by Helen Flook) (1997). HarperCollins. See 1992 radio play below.

Short storiesNight Travellers. Turnstone Press, 1982Ladies of the House. Turnstone Press, 1984Agassiz Stories  (combined the two earlier collections); republished in the US, as Agassiz: A Novel in Stories. Minneapolis: Milkweed, 1991.Agassiz. Traduit de l'anglais par Maryse Trudeau. Montréal : Du Roseau, 1990.The Two-Headed Calf. McClelland & Stewart, 1997

Scripts
Birdsell has also written for television, theatre and radio.

 The Waiting Time. 60 minute radio drama commissioned by CBC produced in Mar. 1993.
 Another View of North. 60 minute radio drama commissioned by CBC and produced in Jun. 1992.
 The Town That Floated Away. 30 minute radio drama produced by Barbara Nicol, CBC, Sept. 1992. Released on CD and cassette, BMG records
 Niagara Falls. A 45-minute film script as part of a trilogy, In Good Season. Produced in a 30-minute format for the CBC The Way We   Are. series. West End Productions Inc.
 Summer Storm. Novina Motion Pictures. 30 minute film script produced for a CBC Family Pictures series.
 Falling In Love. 30 minute film script as part of a trilogy, In Good Season. West End Productions Inc.
 Places Not Our Own. 60 minute drama for the mini series, Daughters of the Country. National Film Board.

Theatre
 A Prairie Boy’s Winter. A one act play for children. Co-written and produced by Prairie Theatre Exchange, 1986.
 The Revival''. A Two Act Play. Commissioned by Prairie Theatre Exchange and produced in 1987.

Archives 
There is Sandra Birdsell archives at Library and Archives Canada.

References

External links
 
 Sandra Birdsell's entry in The Canadian Encyclopedia

1942 births
Living people
Canadian Métis people
20th-century Canadian novelists
21st-century Canadian novelists
Canadian people of German descent
Canadian people of Métis descent
Canadian women novelists
Writers from Regina, Saskatchewan
Writers from Winnipeg
Writers from Manitoba
Members of the Order of Canada
Members of the Saskatchewan Order of Merit
Mennonite writers
Métis writers
20th-century Canadian women writers
21st-century Canadian women writers
Canadian women short story writers
20th-century Canadian short story writers
21st-century Canadian short story writers
Amazon.ca First Novel Award winners